TeLEOS-1 is Singapore's first commercial earth observation satellite launched on a PSLV-C29 vehicle of ISRO from SDSC (Satish Dhawan Space Center) at Sriharikota on 16 December 2015 along with other five satellites developed in Singapore. The satellite is aimed at providing high temporal imagery and geospatial solutions for homeland security and border control; maritime monitoring and disaster management around the equatorial belt. TeLEOS-1 is developed by ST Engineering.

History
In May 2011, ST Electronics (Satcom & Sensor Systems) Pte Ltd, Nanyang Technological University and Defence Science Organisation Laboratories (Singapore) established a joint venture, ST Electronics (Satellite Systems) Pte Ltd (STEE-SatSys), to design, develop and deploy an earth observation satellite with an aim to harness the indigenous potential in satellite development and to check the commercial viability of the satellite. In February 2014, Two independent suppliers of small and microsatellites – ATK Space Systems Inc. of Beltsville MD, United States and ST EE-SatComS - entered into an commercial agreement for the distribution of satellite imagery to the world market. On 5 February 2014, Antrix Corporation, the commercial arm of ISRO, signed a Launch Services Agreement with ST EE-SatComs, Singapore, for the launch of the TeLEOS-1 Earth Observation Satellite. Subsequently, the satellite was launched on 16 December 2015. On 26 July 2016, STEE announced the commencement of its commercial imagery service of the satellite. On 16 February 2016, the first test images of the TeLEOS-1 mission were displayed at the Singapore Airshow 2016.

Payloads
The satellite is equipped with electro-optical camera payload that is capable of performing imaging at ground resolution of down to one metre. It carries 8GB of solid storage for storage of imagery captured by the panchromatic camera.

Applications
The imagery captured by the satellite will be useful in the areas of maritime security and disaster management such as:

 Shipping routes / Sea Lines of Communication
 Pollution (oil slicks, dumping)
 Anchorage monitoring
 Navigation aids & hazards
 Collision avoidance
 Search and rescue
 Natural disasters (earthquake, tsunami)
 Illegal fishing
 Piracy
 Trafficking
 Terrorist threats
 Harbour / Offshore islands protection

Launch
TeLEOS-1, along with five other Singaporean satellites, was launched successfully aboard PSLV-C29 on 16 December 2015. The launch took place at 6 PM local time from Satish Dhawan Space Centre in the southeastern India. The satellite was placed into a 550-kilometer circular orbit inclined at 15 degrees relative to the equator. Singapore government paid 26 million euros ($30 million) for the launch.

References

External links 

 http://www.isro.gov.in/pslv-c29-teleos-1-mission

2015 establishments in Singapore
Satellites of Singapore
Commercial Earth imaging satellites
Spacecraft launched in 2015